Mark Rotella (born 1967) is an American author and senior editor at Publishers Weekly.

Biography
Rotella was born in Connecticut and grew up in St. Petersburg, Florida. He graduated from Columbia University in 1992 with a B.A. in Russian Literature.

Rotella's first book, Stolen Figs: And Other Adventures in Calabria (2004), recounts his travels to Calabria, the region in southern Italy from which his grandparents immigrated. His second book, Amore: The Story of Italian American Song (2010), tells of the era in American popular music during the mid-20th century dominated by Italian-American singers such as Frank Sinatra, Perry Como, Dean Martin, and Tony Bennett. He also wrote the introduction for the 2006 paperback edition of Carlo Levi's memoir, Christ Stopped at Eboli.

Rotella resides in Montclair, New Jersey with his wife and two children.

Publications

 Stolen Figs: And Other Adventures in Calabria (North Point Press, 2004) 
 Introduction to Christ Stopped at Eboli by Carlo Levi (Farrar, Straus and Giroux, 2006) 
 Amore: The Story of Italian American Song (Farrar, Straus and Giroux, 2010)

References

External links
 
 Publisher page

Living people
1967 births
21st-century American memoirists
American travel writers
American male non-fiction writers
American writers about music
American writers of Italian descent
Columbia University School of General Studies alumni
Writers from St. Petersburg, Florida
American magazine editors
Writers from New Jersey
People from Montclair, New Jersey